Geraldine Court (born Geraldine Oldenboorn; July 28, 1942 – November 20, 2010) was an American actress.

Early years
Court was born in Binghamton, New York, but her childhood included living in Nashville and in New Orleans. She received a Frances Fuller Scholarship and studied at the American Academy of Dramatic Arts in New York City.

Career 
Court appeared on the television series The Doctors, Guiding Light,  As the World Turns, Another World, and All My Children. She was also, during a brief time, a writer for the serial Loving.

On stage, Court performed in national touring productions of Barefoot in the Park, Play It Again, Sam, and The Tender Trap. Her off-Broadway work includes The Lower Depths of Maxim Gorki and Possibilities. On Broadway, she performed in the chorus of Medea.

Filmography

Film

Television

References

External links

1942 births
2010 deaths
Actresses from New York (state)
American film actresses
American television actresses
20th-century American actresses
21st-century American women